Ella Maria Eia Rappich (born 23 May 2000, in South Africa), is a Swedish actress.

Rappich grew up in Sigtuna, a suburb to Stockholm in Sweden, and got her first role by chance when the production company FLX visited her school. She made her debut by playing a close friend to the main character in Netflix's first Swedish-produced drama series Quicksand, which premiered on 5 April 2019. Alongside acting, Rappich attends Sigtunaskolan Humanistiska Läroverket in social science education.

Filmography
 2019 – Quicksand (TV series) as Amanda Steen 
 2020–2021 – Lyckoviken (TV series) as Vanessa
 2022 -  The playlist  (TV Series) as Sophia Bendz

External links
 
 McLean-Williams Limited - Ella Rappich

References

Swedish actresses
2000 births
Living people